The Baby Moose was a cyclecar from St. Paul, Minnesota.

History
The car was originally called the Continental. It was then changed to Baby Moose, and made by the Bull Moose-Cutting Automobile Company. It had a 4-cylinder engine and two seats. The price was $360. Production ceased in 1915.

Models

References

Defunct motor vehicle manufacturers of the United States
Cyclecars
Defunct manufacturing companies based in Minnesota
Motor vehicle manufacturers based in Minnesota